The anterior intercostal veins are the veins which drain the anterior intercostal space.

External links
 http://www.informatics.jax.org/cookbook/figures/figure96.shtml
 https://web.archive.org/web/20080214132857/http://www.med.umn.edu/anatomy/6150/CD/Lecture%2BHandouts%2BHTML/2004%2B10%2Bthoracic%2Bwall%2Band%2Blungs.htm

Veins of the torso